Jesús Alberto Barrios Álvarez (born 10 January 1961) is a former Colombian football forward.

Career
Born in La Paz, Cesar, Barrios played club football for Junior de Barranquilla, Atlético Bucaramanga and Envigado. He won the 1980  Colombian league title with Junior.

Barrios made several appearances for the Colombia national football team from 1983 to 1985, and he played at the Copa América 1983.

After he retired from playing, Barrios became a football coach. He managed Valledupar, Envigado and Bucaramanga. He was also an assistant manager at Deportivo Pereira.

References

External links

1961 births
Living people
Colombian footballers
Colombia international footballers
1983 Copa América players
Categoría Primera A players
Categoría Primera B players
Atlético Junior footballers
Atlético Bucaramanga footballers
Envigado F.C. players
Colombian football managers
Envigado F.C. managers
Deportivo Pereira managers

Association football forwards
People from Cesar Department